Whistlin' Dan is a 1932 American pre-Code Western film directed by Phil Rosen and starring Ken Maynard, Joyzelle Joyner (wife of Phil Rosen), and Georges Renavent. It was released on March 20, 1932, by Tiffany Productions. It was re-released in 1937 by Amity Pictures.

The film was a remake of Buck Jones' 1931 Border Law with Jones remaking it again as The Fighting Ranger (1934).

Plot
Three cowpokes have just returned from a cattle drive with a check for $5000 that they immediately use to pay off their large loan and buy supplies with the small remainder for their next drive. A spy for the evil outlaw Serge Karloff overhears the news about the money from Bob, one of the cowpokes as he rides off to Mexico to see his girlfriend.

Karloff's gang ambushes and captures the cowpoke, but discover the money has been given to the bank. Karloff sends word to Dan and July, his captive's two friends that if they doesn't get the $5000 back from the bank and bring it to a prearranged location in Mexico, they will kill their captive.

Dan and July are frantic when the bank won't return their money, so they rob the bank and flee to Mexico. They arrive too late and discover Karloff's gang murdered their friend by firing squad. They return to the US to return the money to the bank, but the heartless bank owner still wants to press charges. They share a cell with a member of the Karloff gang who, when he hears that the pair have been arrested for bank robbery, insists on them joining Karloff's gang after they raid the jail to free him.

Dan uses the opportunity for revenge...

Cast list
 Ken Maynard as Dan Savage
 Joyzelle as Carmelita
 Georges Renavent as Serge Karloff
 Harlan Knight as July
 Don Terry as Bob
 Jack Rockwell as Cal Webster
 Jessie Arnold as Horty

References

External links 
 
 
 

Films directed by Phil Rosen
Tiffany Pictures films
1932 Western (genre) films
1932 films
American Western (genre) films
American black-and-white films
1930s American films
Film remakes